"Groove" (full title Les McCann Presents the Dynamic Jazz Organ of Richard "Groove" Holmes with Ben Webster, Les McCann, Tricky Lofton, Ron Jefferson & George Freeman) is the debut led by organist Richard "Groove" Holmes recorded in 1961 and released on the Pacific Jazz label.

Reception

The Allmusic review by Scott Yanow states: "the result is a loose, enjoyable jam session. In addition to Holmes' appealing organ and McCann's typically funky piano, a major bonus is the brilliant playing of tenor saxophonist Ben Webster, whose tone was at its most gorgeous during this period".

Track listing 
 "Them That's Got" (Ricci Harper, Ray Charles) - 6:20
 "That Healin' Feelin'" (Les McCann) - 5:35
 "Seven Come Eleven" (Charlie Christian, Benny Goodman) – 4:03
 "Deep Purple" (Peter DeRose, Mitchell Parish) - 9:09
 "Good Groove" (Richard Holmes) - 8:10

Personnel 
Richard "Groove" Holmes - organ
Les McCann - piano
Ben Webster - tenor saxophone
Lawrence "Tricky" Lofton - trombone
George Freeman - guitar
Ron Jefferson - drums

References 

Les McCann albums
Richard Holmes (organist) albums
1961 albums
Pacific Jazz Records albums